Legislative elections to elect the members of the 10th Imperial Council were held in Cisleithania, the northern and western ("Austrian") crown lands of Austria-Hungary, from December 12, 1900 to January 18, 1901.

Electoral system
The elections were held according to the parameters set in 1896 Badeni electoral reform which classified  voters according to their status and wealth into five curiae: 
Landowners (85 seats)
Trade and industry chambers (21 seats)
Large and medium farmers (129 seats)
Male city residents who were annually paying at least 5 guilders worth of taxes (118 seats)
All men older than 24 (72 seats)

The votes for the Farming and Men over 24 curiae were also classified into 2 different categories, direct votes and electoral votes. Electoral votes carried a lot more weight than direct votes, and so the parties that won these seats generally did not get seats based on their total vote counts.

Only 6% of the adult population of Cisleithania had a right to vote. Voting took place in stages, with the last elections being held in 1st curiae in Lower Austria.

Results

By parliamentary grouping
The largest groups after the election were the Polish Club, the Young Czech Party and the German People's Party, which together had 164 seats.

The elections did not significantly alter relations in the Imperial Council and maintained the highly fragmented political spectrum. The Young Czech Party saw some weakening due to the formation of independent political parties such as Czech Agrarian Party and the Czech National Social Party. Czech National Socials represented a new trend in voter preferences, strengthening the nationalist forces. Significantly, they succeed Pan-German Association. These elections led to the weakening of the social democratic parties, with the Social Democrats gaining only 10 seats.

Compared with previous elections, turnout fell. In the 5th curia, under 30% of eligible voters voted. Historian Otto Urban interprets this as a result of the declining influence of the Council in Austrian political life. At the same time it was a more general change of attitude towards the elected legislative bodies.

The elections had no impact on the Government because the Cabinet of Ernest von Koerber had a mandate from its election in 1900 until 1904.

In early February 1901, the Imperial Council had 20 political groups:

References

Cisleithanian legislative elections
Cisleithania
Cisleithania
1900 in Austria-Hungary
1901 in Austria-Hungary
December 1900 events
January 1901 events